Paul March (born 25 July 1979) is an English former professional rugby league footballer who played in the 1990s, 2000s and 2010s, and has coached in the 2000s and 2010s.

Background
March was born in Thornhill, West Yorkshire, England.

Career

In 2006's Super League XI during the Huddersfield Giants versus the Catalans Dragons match, Paul sustained a cruciate ligament knee injuryand was ruled out for the rest of the season. He was released from his contract at Huddersfield without playing another game, and later signed for Wakefield Trinity for the 2007 season.

Paul became player-coach for York in 2008, leaving Wakefield Trinity after just one season, and in July 2009 he joined Championship 1 club Hunslet as player-coach. He later moved to Keighley, again as player-coach, leaving the club at the end of the 2016 season. 

Paul became Featherstone Rovers Reserves Head Coach and Assistant First Coach working under new Rovers Boss Ryan Carr in 2019.

Genealogical information
Paul March is the twin brother of the rugby league footballer; David March.

References

External links
(archived by web.archive.org) Paul March Wildcats Profile
(archived by web.archive.org) Profile at yorkcityknights.co.uk

1979 births
Living people
Castleford Tigers players
English rugby league coaches
English rugby league players
Huddersfield Giants players
Hunslet R.L.F.C. coaches
Hunslet R.L.F.C. players
Keighley Cougars coaches
Keighley Cougars players
People from Thornhill, West Yorkshire
Rugby league five-eighths
Rugby league halfbacks
Rugby league hookers
Rugby league locks
Rugby league players from Dewsbury
English twins
Twin sportspeople
Wakefield Trinity players
York City Knights coaches
York City Knights players